Kungota pri Ptuju (in older sources Sveta Jungert) is a village in the Municipality of Kidričevo in northeastern Slovenia. The area is part of the traditional region of Styria. It is now included with the rest of the municipality in the Drava Statistical Region.

Name
The name of the settlement was changed from Sveta Kungota (literally, 'Saint Cunigunde') to Kungota pri Ptuju (literally, 'Cunigunde near Ptuj') in 1955. The name was changed on the basis of the 1948 Law on Names of Settlements and Designations of Squares, Streets, and Buildings as part of efforts by Slovenia's postwar communist government to remove religious elements from toponyms.

Church
The local church, from which the settlement gets its name, is dedicated to Saint Cunigunde and belongs to the Parish of Hajdina. It dates to the 14th century with numerous later additions and adaptations.

References

External links
Kungota pri Ptuju on Geopedia

Populated places in the Municipality of Kidričevo